Johnny Lee Bailey (March 17, 1967 – August 20, 2010) was an American football running back in the National Football League (NFL). He was also a part of Houston's Yates High School football team when it won the 1985 5A state championship.

Career 
Bailey was drafted out of Texas A&I University (now named Texas A&M University–Kingsville) in the 1990 NFL Draft by the Chicago Bears.  While at Texas A&I, Bailey was the first, and so far only, player to be a three-time winner of the Harlon Hill Trophy, which is given to the best player in Division II college football. He played for the Bears for two years before going on to the Arizona Cardinals for two years, as well as playing for the Los Angeles/St. Louis Rams.  During his NFL career he played in 81 games and scored nine touchdowns.

Death 
Bailey died on August 20, 2010, of pancreatic cancer. He is buried at the Houston Memorial Gardens in Pearland, Texas.

References

External links
 
 

1967 births
2010 deaths
American football return specialists
American football running backs
Chicago Bears players
Iowa Barnstormers players
Los Angeles Rams players
Phoenix Cardinals players
St. Louis Rams players
Texas A&M–Kingsville Javelinas football players
College Football Hall of Fame inductees
National Conference Pro Bowl players
Players of American football from Houston
African-American players of American football
Deaths from pancreatic cancer
Deaths from cancer in Texas
20th-century African-American sportspeople